William Clarence "Cal" Hawk (October 20, 1847 – December 16, 1899) was an American professional baseball player in the 1870s.  He played as a pitcher for the Oil City Senecas, the New Castle Neshannocks and the Bradford team.  In 1873, he became the first pitcher to receive a stated salary, being paid $62 per month.  He has been called "the first real professional hurler the game ever had."  In 1899, the Sporting Life reported that he was "one of the first twirlers to pitch a curve ball, which in his time was considered a wonderful feat."

Hawk retired from professional baseball in 1877, though he continued to participate in games at Freeport, Pennsylvania.  Hawk was employed by Guckenheimer & Bros. distillery in Freeeport after retiring from baseball.  While at work, he fell on his head onto a cement floor from a height of approximately 12 feet.  The concussion from the fall led to traumatic meningitis, and Hawk died at his home in Freeport, Pennsylvania, in December 1899 at age 52. He was buried at the Freeport Cemetery.

References

1847 births
1899 deaths
19th-century baseball players
Bradford (minor league baseball) players
Oil City (minor league baseball) players
New Castle Neshannocks players
People from Freeport, Pennsylvania